Khera Khurampur is a village in Farrukhnagar in Gurgaon district of Haryana state, India. Farrukhnagar tehsil is part of Ahirwal Region. Its Pincode is 122506.

References

External links

Forts in Haryana
Populated places established in 1732